The Canadian national quidditch team made its debut in 2012 at the IQA Summer Games in Oxford, UK, where it placed 4th of 5 teams. The team once again represented Canada at the 2014 IQA Global Games in Burnaby, BC on July 29, 2014 where it took third place, coming behind the United States and Australia, respectively.

History
The national team made its debut in 2012 at the International Quidditch Association (IQA) Summer Games in Oxford, UK. The team featured players from Ontario, British Columbia, and Québec. The team was created just two months before the championships and thus had no tryouts and was composed of players who were able to travel to the UK to compete. The tournament format began with a round-robin between all five participating teams (USA, Canada, France, Australia, and the UK) and then a ranked bracket. After the round-robin, Team Canada was seeded second; however, after back-to-back losses to France and Australia, they fell to fourth place.

The selection process for the 2014 Global Games involved rigorous tryouts for potential players. Tryouts saw 74 potential candidates between video submissions and two tryouts: one in Eastern Canada in Kingston, ON and one in Western Canada in Vancouver, BC. Players who were unable to attend either the East or West try-outs were able to submit video tryouts. The selected team features players from a variety of backgrounds and university teams, notably University of British Columbia, University of Ottawa, University of Toronto, Université de Montréal, McGill University, Queen's University, Carleton University, Tufts College, and Kansas University.

The 2014 Canadian national team competed on July 19, 2014 at the Burnaby Lake sports complex in Burnaby, British Columbia against 5 other announced national teams: Belgium, Italy, Australia, the UK, and the USA. The Global Games is a biennial event run by the International Quidditch Association that, unlike regular-season IQA games, features national teams from quidditch-playing nations instead of collegiate or community teams. Canada took third place in the 2014 IQA Global Games following the United States and Australia, respectively.

Roster and coaches

2019

2018 

For the 2018 IQA World Cup in Florence, Italy, the Canadian National Quidditch team had a change of leadership in which Michael Howard (Valhalla Quidditch formerly, uOttawa Quidditch) took over as head captain and Rachel Malone was retained as an assistant coach and former National Team beater Mathew McVeigh joined as the second assistant coach.  In addition Brian galloway served as team coordinator and Bethan Morgan, Jill Staniec, and Lisa Tubb served as National team Fundraising Lead, National Team Manager, National Team Communication Lead respectively.  The Canadian team was placed in Group E with Malaysia, Germany, and Iceland. Gieven their grouping they competed the teams in Group F: Norway, New Zealand, Spain, and Switzerland.  In these four games against the teams in Group F, Canada finished 3-1 beating Switzerland 200*-0, Norway 120*-80, and New Zealand 240*-0 while losing to Spain 50-70*.
Canada finished Day 1 in 9th place pitting them in a matchup against the 8th seeded Turkey, which ended with a 130*-110 Turkey victory.  Following this loss, Canada's title chances were dashed but they proceeded through the Consolation brackets with wins against the Czech Republic, Norway and a redemption win against Spain to close out the tournament with a final seeding of 9th place.

2016 
For the 2016 IQA World Cup in Frankfurt Germany, the Canadian National Quidditch team had a change of leadership in which Chris Radojewski (Alberta Clippers Quidditch) took over as head captain and Matthew Bourassa (Carleton Quidditch) and Paul Gour (Dalhousie Quidditch) were selected as Assistant Coaches.  Due to medical reasons Paul Gour was unable to travel with the team and was replaced by Alternate Roster member Rachel Malone and served as speaking captain. The Canadian team finished 4th losing to Australia 80*-40 in the semis finals and the United Kingdom in the bronze match 190*-60.

2014  
The 2014 team coaches were selected by IQA Canadian Director Tegan Bridge after an application process. Hugh Podmore of Valhalla Quidditch was selected as Head Coach, and Rebecca Alley of the University of Ottawa GeeGees was chosen as Assistant Coach. The roster for the 2014 Global Games was announced on May 18, 2014.

There was no selection process for the 2012 team, which was composed largely of individuals who were able and willing to travel to Oxford, England, to play.

Jerseys
The 2012 Summer Games jerseys were designed by David Danos. After the games, they were discontinued due to their similarity to Hockey Canada's logo.

Quidditch Canada announced on May 29, 2014 that Adam Robillard's jersey submission had been selected featuring a stylized maple leaf on a black background.

Competitive record
Team Canada made their debut at the 2012 IQA Summer Games, where they placed fourth of five teams. Due to how the team was chosen (those who could afford to make it over having try-outs) and the fact that the team had a smaller roster of newer players, the Canadian team had difficulties keeping pace with the other teams toward the end of the day. However, only Team France and Team USA posed formidable threats to the Canadian team, whereas the loss against Team Australia was due to a withering team and a lost snitch catch in the end.

At the 2014 IQA Global Games, however, Team Canada was a favoured team. Ultimately, Team Canada lost against both the US and Australia, coming close in the game against Team Australia, ending in third place.

* Indicates that that was forfeited with a 150*-0 loss.

** Indicates unknown game time.

* Indicates that that was forfeited with a 150*-0 loss.

** Indicates unknown game time.

See also

 Quidditch Canada
 International Quidditch Association
 Sport in Canada

External links
 Team Canada Indiegogo Page
 Quidditch Canada Facebook Page
 Quidditch Canada Twitter

References

Quidditch national teams
Quidditch
Sports clubs established in 2012
2012 establishments in Canada